Astarte undata, or the waved astarte, is a species of bivalve mollusc in the family Astartidae. It can be found along the Atlantic coast of North America, ranging from Labrador to Maryland.

References

Astartidae
Bivalves described in 1841